Lovellona atramentosa is a species of sea snail, a marine gastropod mollusk in the family Mitromorphidae.

Description
The shell size varies between 5 mm and 13 mm

The shell is encircled by finely pricked grooves. It has a chestnut-color with generally a few white spots on the shoulder, and is white-tinted at the base.

Distribution
This species occurs in the Indian Ocean off the Aldabra Atoll, Mozambique and KwaZuluNatal, in the Indo-West Pacific.

References

 Taylor, J.D. (1973). Provisional list of the mollusca of Aldabra Atoll
 Steyn, D.G. & Lussi, M. (1998) Marine Shells of South Africa. An Illustrated Collector’s Guide to Beached Shells. Ekogilde Publishers, Hartebeespoort, South Africa, ii + 264 pp
 Filmer R.M. (2001). A Catalogue of Nomenclature and Taxonomy in the Living Conidae 1758 - 1998. Backhuys Publishers, Leiden. 388pp
 Liu J.Y. [Ruiyu] (ed.). (2008). Checklist of marine biota of China seas. China Science Press. 1267 pp
 Tucker J.K. (2009). Recent cone species database. September 4, 2009 Edition
 Chino M. & Stahlschmidt P. (2009) New turrid species of the Mitromorpha-complex (Gastropoda: Conidae: Clathurellinae) from the Philippines and Japan. Visaya 2(4): 63–82.
 Severns, M. (2011). Shells of the Hawaiian Islands - The Sea Shells. Conchbooks, Hackenheim. 564 pp.

External links
 

atramentosa